Zvezdin is a Russian surname. Notable people with the surname include:

Andrey Zvezdin (born 1986), Belarusian footballer
Arkady Severny (1939–1980, born Arkady Dmitrievich Zvezdin), Russian singer

Russian-language surnames